"Simple Simon" is the debut single by Australian rock band INXS, released in May 1980 via Deluxe Records. The title track was co-written by four of the group's members, Garry Gary Beers, Andrew Farriss, Jon Farriss, Tim Farriss and Michael Hutchence. The B-side, "We Are the Vegetables", was co-written by A Farriss, J Farriss, T Farriss, Hutchence and Kirk Pengilly. This title refers to an early band name, the Vegetables, which they used when performing in Perth in 1978.

Besides Australia the single was released in France (via RCA Victor). It was not included on the band's first album, INXS, which was issued in October 1980 but appeared on a compilation album, INXSIVE, in 1982.

Track listing
 "Simple Simon" (Garry Gary Beers, Andrew Farriss, Jon Farriss, Tim Farriss, Michael Hutchence) – 2:32
 "We Are the Vegetables" (A Farriss, J Farriss, T Farriss, Hutchence, Kirk Pengilly) – 1:53

References

External links
 

1980 songs
1980 debut singles
INXS songs